A V24 engine is a 24-cylinder piston engine where two banks of twelve cylinders are arranged in a V configuration around a common crankshaft. The majority of V24 engines, however, have been "dual V12" engines where two separate V12 engines are placed in line with each other.

Fiat AS.6 aircraft engine 

This V24 aero engine was built in the early 1930s to power the Macchi M.C.72 aeroplane, which was intended to compete in the 1931 Schneider Trophy air races. This engine was in reality formed by mounting two Fiat AS.5 V12 engines one behind the other, with the front engine powering the rear propeller and the rear engine powering the front propeller.

This set the record for a piston-powered seaplane, a record which stands to this day.

Detroit Diesel 24V71 
The Detroit Diesel Series 71 24V71 engine with a displacement of 1,704 cu in (28.8 L) and 2,000 hp. They were manufactured from 1994 to 1997.

See also 
 V engine

References

24
Piston engine configurations
24-cylinder engines